The women's 100 metres hurdles event at the 1997 Summer Universiade was held on 29 and 30 August at the Stadio Cibali in Catania, Italy.

Medalists

Results

Heats
Wind:Heat 1: +1.7 m/s, Heat 2: +0.7 m/s, Heat 3: +0.6 m/s, Heat 4: -1.3 m/s

Semifinals
Wind:Heat 1: +1.0 m/s, Heat 2: +2.4 m/s

Final

Wind: -1.1 m/s

References

Athletics at the 1997 Summer Universiade
1997 in women's athletics
1997